Kortavij-e Sofla (also Romanized as Kortavīj-e Soflá; also known as Gortavīch-e Soflá) is a village in Kanduleh Rural District, Dinavar District, Sahneh County, Kermanshah Province, Iran. At the 2006 census, its population was 182, in 44 families.

References 

Populated places in Sahneh County